The Fundata is a left tributary of the river Ialomița in Romania. It discharges into the Ialomița near Misleanu.

References

Rivers of Romania
Rivers of Ialomița County